Oweishiyeh or Uwaishiyah is a village in al-Bab District in northern Aleppo Governorate, northwestern Syria.

Syrian Civil War 
On 5 February 2017, the Syrian Army captured the village from Islamic State of Iraq and the Levant.

References 

Populated places in al-Bab District